The 1974 Stanley Cup Finals was the championship series of the National Hockey League's (NHL) 1973–74 season, and the culmination of the 1974 Stanley Cup playoffs. It was contested between the Boston Bruins and the Philadelphia Flyers. The Flyers made their first Finals appearance and the Bruins returned to the Finals for the third time in five years, having won the Stanley Cup in 1970 and 1972. The Flyers won the best-of-seven series, four games to two, becoming the first team from the 1967 Expansion to win the Stanley Cup, as well as the first non-Original Six Cup champion since the Montreal Maroons in 1935.

Paths to the Finals
Boston defeated the Toronto Maple Leafs 4–0 and the Chicago Black Hawks 4–2 to advance to the final.

Philadelphia defeated the Atlanta Flames 4–0 and the New York Rangers 4–3 to make it to the final.

Game summaries
In the previous 19 games against the Bruins in Boston, the Flyers had lost 17 and tied two. Boston had the best regular season record in the league finishing one point ahead of the Flyers. The Bruins also had home ice advantage in the Stanley Cup Finals, and were made heavy favorites to win the series. A key confidence-building win late in the regular season saw the Flyers defeating the Bruins 5–3 at the Spectrum in Philadelphia.

The first two games at Boston Garden were full of late game dramatics. In game one, the Flyers nearly scored late in the third period to break a 2–2 tie. Bobby Orr, having saved the Flyers' shot by blocking the open Boston net with his leg, then took the puck up the ice and scored on a slapshot past goaltender Bernie Parent with a little over a minute remaining in regulation time to propel the Bruins to a 3–2 win. Game two saw the Bruins on the verge of a 2–0 series lead when Flyers defenseman Andre Dupont scored with Parent pulled with less than a minute remaining for an extra attacker to tie the score at 2–2, and Bobby Clarke scored the 3–2 game winner in overtime.

The Flyers, led by Parent's play in goal, won the next two games on home ice to take a 3–1 series lead. Game five in Boston was a sloppy affair marred by many fights and penalties as Boston easily won to extend the series to a game six in Philadelphia.  Before a national audience watching the game on NBC and a raucous Philadelphia crowd, Parent posted an epic 30-save shutout against the Bruins as the Flyers won the game 1–0, the series four games to two, and the Stanley Cup. Parent made a spectacular kick save to stop a tremendous slapshot from Ken Hodge with less than three minutes left to play. The blast was the Bruins' final shot of the series. Parent was named the winner of the Conn Smythe Trophy as playoff MVP. The Flyers were the first of the 1967 expansion teams in the NHL to win the championship.

Aftermath
The Flyers Stanley Cup win triggered the largest celebration in Philadelphia sports history. Some observers of the celebration noted that they had seen that type of event in Philadelphia only once before, upon the announcement of the surrender of Japan on 14 August 1945.  The day after the Flyers won the Cup, more than two million lined Broad Street for a ticker-tape parade, making it the largest championship parade in the history of Philadelphia sports. One of the fans who attended the parade was future New York Rangers goaltender Mike Richter. Richter grew up near Philadelphia in Flourtown, Pennsylvania idolizing Flyers goalie Bernie Parent.

The following year, the Flyers successfully returned to the Finals and captured their second consecutive Stanley Cup; this time, over the Buffalo Sabres in Buffalo, also winning in six games.

As for the Bruins, they lost in the first round to the Chicago Black Hawks 2–1.

Team rosters

Philadelphia Flyers

|}

Boston Bruins

|}

Stanley Cup engraving
The 1974 Stanley Cup was presented to Flyers captain Bobby Clarke by NHL President Clarence Campbell following the Flyers 1–0 win over the Bruins in game six.

The following Flyers players and staff had their names engraved on the Stanley Cup

1973–74 Philadelphia Flyers

Bruce Cowick didn't play any regular season games for the Flyers in 1973–74 but was an injury replacement for eight games in the Stanley Cup playoffs, thus becoming eligible to receive a Stanley Cup ring and have his name engraved on the Stanley Cup.

See also
 1973–74 NHL season
 1973–74 Boston Bruins season
 1973–74 Philadelphia Flyers season

Notes

References
 
 

Stanley Cup
Stanley Cup Finals
Boston Bruins games
Philadelphia Flyers games
Ice hockey competitions in Philadelphia
Ice hockey competitions in Boston
Stanley Cup Finals
1970s in Philadelphia
Stanley Cup Finals
Stanley Cup Finals
Stanley Cup Finals
Boston Garden